Elections for Hounslow Council in London were held on 6 May 2010.  The 2010 United Kingdom General Election and other local elections took place on the same day.

In London council elections the entire council is elected every four years, as opposed to some local elections where one councillor is elected every year in three of the four years.

Summary of results

References

Council elections in the London Borough of Hounslow
2010 London Borough council elections
May 2010 events in the United Kingdom